Gassner is a surname. Notable people with the surname include:

 Alexander Gassner (born 1989), German skeleton racer
 Dennis Gassner (born 1948), Canadian production designer
 Hermann Gassner (born 1988), German rally driver
 Peter Gassner (born 1965), American billionaire businessman

Surnames of Liechtenstein origin

German-language surnames